The football (soccer) Campeonato Brasileiro Série B 1972, the second level of Brazilian National League, was played from September 10 to December 17, 1972. The competition had 23 clubs. All of the participating clubs were from the Northeast region.

Sampaio Corrêa beat Campinense on the finals, and was declared 1972 Brazilian Série B champions. The relegation and promotion system had not been implemented yet, so no clubs were promoted. As the First division of the championship began to grow in number of clubs, this edition of the second division was the last one until 1980.

First phase
Group A

Group B

Group C

Group D

Second phase
Group E

Group F

Finals

Notes

Sources
 RSSSF.com
 Globoesporte.com 

Campeonato Brasileiro Série B seasons
B